Major Patrick Hunter Gordon CBE MC FRSE (6 December 1916-28 March 1978) was a Scottish soldier and electrical engineer. He was Managing Director of both AI Welders and Cable Belt.

Life 
He was born on 6 December 1916 in Inverness, the son of Samuel Gordon Hunter (b.1877) and his wife, Clare Agnes Johnston from County Down.

He was educated at Cargilfield Preparatory School in Edinburgh then Oundle School in Northamptonshire then went to Cambridge University where he graduated MA.

He next undertook military training at the Royal Military Academy Sandhurst joining the Royal Engineers in 1936.

In the Second World War he was located at Fort Hahenberg and Brillon near Lille on the Maginot Line in March 1940.

In June 1948 he became an instructor at Camberley Staff College.

He died in a car accident on 28 March 1978 and was buried at Tomnahurich in Inverness.

Family 

In 1940 he married Valerie de Ferranti (granddaughter of Sebastian Ziani de Ferranti founder of Ferranti). Valerie Hunter Gordon came to fame in 1947 as the inventor of one of the world's first disposable nappies, the PADDI.

References 

1916 births
1978 deaths
Commanders of the Order of the British Empire
Fellows of the Royal Society of Edinburgh
Recipients of the Military Cross
Military personnel from Inverness
Royal Engineers officers
Scottish electrical engineers
Alumni of the University of Cambridge
People educated at Oundle School
Scottish chief executives
Road incident deaths in Scotland
20th-century Scottish businesspeople